Sattahip Bay is a bay in the east side of the Gulf of Siam or Gulf of Thailand. It is in Sattahip District, Chonburi Province, Thailand.

History
Prince Abhakara Kiartivongse (1880–1923), son of King Chulalongkorn, inspected Sattahip Bay in 1922 and saw that it was an ideal place to establish a naval base. Subsequently, he offered royal land in Sattahip in order to build the present-day naval facilities.

Sattahip Bay is the part of the Sattahip Naval Base area, the largest base of the Royal Thai Navy.

Occasionally Sattahip Bay is invaded by jellyfish.

Geography
Sattahip Bay lies at the south end of Chonburi Province. It is open towards the southwest and is bound by limestone rock formations forming peninsulas to the west over Laem Chalak and to the southeast at Khao Chong Khaep.

Islands
There are several islands in the bay area, the largest being Ko Tao Mo, towards the western end of the mouth of the bay. Smaller Ko I Lao is the island further off-shore.

See also
List of islands of Thailand

References

External links

Sattahip Bay view

Bays of Thailand
Gulf of Thailand
Geography of Chonburi province